Nir Davidovich (also spelled Davidovitch; born 17 December 1976) is an Israeli former professional footballer who played as a goalkeeper.

At club level, Davidovich spent his whole career in Maccabi Haifa. He suffered from 3 serious injuries, but managed to recover and lead the team to its 8th championship, winning the MVP title in 2004. He is considered a "symbol" of the club along with the veteran captain Yaniv Katan. Many talk about him as the successor of legendary goalkeeper Avi Ran, a Maccabi Haifa prodigy who died in a diving accident.

At international level, he was the number one goalkeeper in the Israeli national team for a time.

Early life
Davidovich was born in Haifa, Israel, to a Jewish family. His father is footballer Benjamin Davidovich.

Records 
 Nickname: "The Octopus"
 Birth Date: 17 December 1976.
 Played for: Maccabi Haifa, Israel
 First Appearance:
 Domestic - 4 November 1995 versus Beitar Jerusalem.
 International - 18 February 1998 versus Turkey.
 Number of appearances (as for September 2011) at:
 Israel national team - 51 (1 as captain).
 European competitions - 55.
 Domestic league - 368.
 Domestic cup - 39.
 Height: 185 cm.
 Weight: 85 kg.
 Status: married to Avital, with three children.
 Honours: 7 championships, 2 Israeli cups, 3 Toto Cups, 1 MVP of the season.

Football career 
 
 Played in each age-class youth national team of Israel.
 1995: Promoted to senior team of Maccabi Haifa.
 1996: Gave outstanding performance when Maccabi Haifa kept a 0–0 against Hapoel Petah Tikva after 3 (!) "greens" were sent off.
 1997: Overcame veteran goalkeeper Bonni Ginzburg to become MHFC senior goalkeeper.
 1998: First international appearance at Israel 4–0 victory over Turkey.
 1998: Wins the Israeli cup after 2–0 victory over Hapoel Jerusalem.
 1998: Excels in 1–1 draw against French top football club Paris Saint-Germain.
 1999: Injured seriously in the crotch and missed the entire season.
 2000–2001: Won the championship with Maccabi Haifa, conceding only 28 goals (the lowest in that season).
 2001: Injured in his knee in the match versus Spain, where he kept the Israeli goal clean until he was replaced in half-time.
 2002: Missed most of the season because of his knee injury.
 2003: Recovered from knee injury and played the final matches in the league.
 2003: Excelled in MHFC 0:0 draw against Valencia. After his performance he received grades of 10 in the Israeli press (just seven players received grade of 10 in the history of the Israeli press) and was dubbed "The Octopus" by the Spanish press.
 2003–2004: Won the championship with Maccabi Haifa and chosen by player, press and coaches as the MVP of the season.
 2004: saves a penalty kick as Israel beat Cyprus 2–1 in a 2006 FIFA World Cup qualifier.
 2009: On 19 April Davidovich made his 300th league appearance in Maccabi Haifa.
 2009: First time in the UEFA Champions League with Maccabi Haifa.
 2010: Davidovich and Maccabi Haifa conceded only 16 goals in 35 league games, breaking the national record of lowest average goals per games.
 2013: Nir Davidovich retired from football as a player. Throughout his career he played in Maccabi Haifa F.C., 18 years of the Club Concierge.

Career statistics

Honours

Club
Maccabi Haifa

Israeli Premier League (7):
2000–01, 2001–02, 2003–04, 2004–05, 2005–06, 2006–07, 2008–09, 2010–11

Israel State Cup (2):
1995, 1998

Toto Cup Top Division (3):
2002-03, 2005–06, 2007–08

Individual
Maccabi Haifa
Footballer of the Year in Israel (1): 2004

See also
List of one-club men

References

1976 births
Living people
Israeli Jews
Association football goalkeepers
Israeli footballers
Israel international footballers
Maccabi Haifa F.C. players
Liga Leumit players
Israeli Premier League players
Footballers from Haifa
Israeli people of Romanian-Jewish descent
Israeli Footballer of the Year recipients